William Barlow (died 1613) was an Anglican priest and courtier during the reign of James I of England. He served as Bishop of Rochester in 1605 and Bishop of Lincoln in the Church of England from 1608 until his death. He had also served the church as Rector of St Dunstan's, Stepney in Middlesex and of Orpington, in Kent. He was also Dean of Chester Cathedral, and secured prebends in Chiswick and Westminster.

Career 
As a trusted member of the court, he was appointed to the directorship of the "Second Westminster Company" charged by James with translating the New Testament epistles for the King James Version of the Bible. He participated in the early planning for the translation, and had supported the scholarship of linguist Edward Lively, among other contributions to the project.

Barlow's scholarly career had begun at St John's College, Cambridge, where he had graduated in 1584, earned a Master of Arts in 1587, and was admitted as a Fellow in 1590. His publications showed his talents both for scholarship and preferment.

Death 
Barlow was buried at St Mary's Church, Buckden, Huntingdonshire. His wife's name is unknown but his daughter and co-heir, Alice, married Sir Henry Yelverton, Knt.

See also 

 John Young (bishop of Rochester)
 Richard Neile

References

Knighton, C. S., ‘Barlow, William (d. 1613)’, Oxford Dictionary of National Biography, Oxford University Press, Sept 2004; online edn, Jan 2008
McClure, Alexander. (1858) The Translators Revived: A Biographical Memoir of the Authors of the English Version of the Holy Bible. Mobile, Alabama: R. E. Publications (republished by the Marantha Bible Society, 1984 ASIN B0006YJPI8 )
Nicolson, Adam. (2003) God's Secretaries: The Making of the King James Bible. New York: HarperCollins 

16th-century births
1613 deaths
Anglican clergy from London
Translators of the King James Version
Bishops of Rochester
Bishops of Lincoln
17th-century Church of England bishops
Deans of Chester
Alumni of St John's College, Cambridge
17th-century English translators
16th-century Anglican theologians
17th-century Anglican theologians